Antonio León Zapata (born 7 January 1949) is a Peruvian politician. He is a Congressman representing Apurímac for the 2006–2011 term, and belongs to the Union for Peru party. He is the President of Parliament Group Popular Faction. He was Third Vice President of the Congress from 2009 to 2010

References

Union for Peru politicians
We Are Peru politicians
Members of the Congress of the Republic of Peru
Living people
1949 births